"Sunset Lover" is a song by French DJ and music producer Petit Biscuit. It was first published on SoundCloud on 22 February 2015, initially available as a free download, and was released independently on 15 June 2015, later featuring on his eponymous debut EP (2016), debut album Presence (2017), and compilation album We Were Young (The Playlist) (2019).

"Sunset Lover" entered the French Singles Chart in May 2016, and went on to peak at number 3 in March 2017. As of April 2022, it has amassed over 690 million streams on Spotify.

Music video
A music video to accompany the release of "Sunset Lover" was first released onto YouTube on 8 September 2016 at a total length of three minutes and thirty-six seconds.

Track listings

Charts

Weekly charts

Year-end charts

Certifications

Release history

References

2015 singles
2015 songs
Petit Biscuit songs
Song recordings produced by Petit Biscuit
Songs written by Petit Biscuit
Tropical house songs